John Loughridge (14 February 1923  – 4 November 1981) was an Australian rules footballer who played with West Perth in the West Australian National Football League (WANFL) during the 1940s.

Centremen John Loughridge had his best league season in 1946 when he not only won a Simpson Medal for his performance in West Perth's losing Grand Final side but he was also awarded a Sandover Medal for his efforts during the season. He had been runner up in the Sandover in 1945 and was club champion at West Perth on three occasions over the course of his career. Loughridge played in West Perth's 1949 premiership side and was also a three time state representative.

In 2002 he was named as a half forward flanker in West Perth's official 'Team of the Century'.

References

External links

1923 births
1981 deaths
Australian rules footballers from Western Australia
West Perth Football Club players
Sandover Medal winners
West Australian Football Hall of Fame inductees